Archie is a long-running American comic strip based on the line of the popular Archie Comics. Launched by McClure Newspaper Syndicate on February 4, 1946, it features the misadventures of Archie Andrews and his pals. Archie is currently distributed by the Creators Syndicate.

Publication history 
Bob Montana drew the first issue of the Archie comic book (November 1942). In 1946, he began drawing Archie daily and Sunday strips for 700 newspapers. He died of a heart attack on January 4, 1975, while cross-country skiing in Meredith. Dan DeCarlo then took over the strip.

The Archie comic strip was written by Craig Boldman, pencilled by Fernando Ruiz, lettered by Jon D'Agostino, and inked by Bob Smith until June 2011. After that, Archie's publisher ceased creating new strips and began reprinting older strips by Dan DeCarlo.

See also
 Cartoonists Remember 9/11

References

External links
 Archie at ComicStripFan.com

American comic strips
Archie Comics titles